Sengkang is a planning area and residential town located in the North-East Region of Singapore. The town is the second most populous in the region, being home to 249,370 residents in 2020. Sengkang shares boundaries with Seletar and Punggol in the north, Pasir Ris and Paya Lebar in the east, Hougang and Serangoon to the south, as well as Yishun and Ang Mo Kio to the west.

Originally a fishing village, the area underwent rapid development under the ambition of the Housing and Development Board (HDB) to transform it into a fully mature housing estate.

Etymology
The name Sengkang means "prosperous harbour" in Chinese, and “to chock, block or wedge” in Malay. The name was derived from Lorong Sengkang, a former Malay kampong road, off Lorong Buangkok. Lorongs were common in the area before urban redevelopment. The area was formerly known as Kangkar (Gang Jiao 港脚) or "foot of the port" as there was once a fishing port located along Sungei Serangoon.

History

Sengkang originated from the area once called Kangkar, named after the port and fishing village along Sungei Serangoon. By the mid-20th century, the area was home to several rubber, pepper, and pineapple plantations. At that time, the nearest public housing estate then was the Punggol Rural Centre located along Punggol Road. Sengkang was largely left alone until 1994, when an urban design team of ten from HDB began conceptualization for a new town in Sengkang. Sengkang was carved up into seven subzones that would house a total of 95,000 public and private housing units in the long term.

Conjured by local newspapers, Sengkang's theme became 'Town of the Seafarer', which reflects its history as a fishing village. Two sub-themes were assigned to the four neighbourhood areas (namely Rivervale, Compassvale, Anchorvale, and Fernvale) of the new town: one reflected Sengkang's marine history, while the other related to the sprawling plantations that previously covered parts of the area. The neighborhoods were each given a name and a colour scheme to go with their respective themes. The three-storey pilotis or stilt effect was also utilized in the design of housing blocks, to resemble the stilts of fishing villages and trunks of the various plantations of bygone years.

The town's first apartment blocks (known locally as flats) at Rivervale were completed in 1997. By August 2001, about 33,700 dwelling units were completed. As of 31 March 2017, there are 65,981 HDB dwelling units in Sengkang.

In October 1999, a steering committee chaired by Dr Michael Lim, then Member of Parliament for Cheng San Group Representation Constituency, was formed to look into providing sufficient amenities in Sengkang New Town. In view of feedback from residents, it completed its report on the need for facilities and services in the new town in July 2000. They coordinated with various organizations to open more void-deck precinct shops, a new shopping mall and childcare centres.

Geography

Sengkang is a primarily residential town situated to the north of Hougang New Town in the north-eastern part of Singapore, under the North-East Region as defined by the Urban Redevelopment Authority (URA).

The town is bordered to the north by the Tampines Expressway (TPE), to the east by the Kallang–Paya Lebar Expressway (KPE), Yio Chu Kang Road and Buangkok Drive to the south and the Central Expressway (CTE) to the west. Sungei Punggol (Punggol River) cuts through the new town, and divides the town into Sengkang East and Sengkang West. Sengkang Town Centre is located in Compassvale. A new industrial area, 'Sengkang West Industrial Area', is to be built to the west of Sengkang West Road in the near future.

The construction of Sengkang West Road, which begins where Yio Chu Kang Road and Jalan Kayu intersect, started in 2011 and the first section was opened to traffic on 13 October 2013. The remaining section of the road opened on 16 May 2015. The road passes through the extended roads of Fernvale Lane, Sengkang West Avenue, Sengkang West Way in front of the Fernvale neighbourhood, cuts through the TPE across the Seletar Aerospace Flyover and links to Seletar Aerospace Park. An extension of Sengkang West Way to Sengkang West Road opened on 14 May 2017.

Subzones
Sengkang New Town is divided into the following seven subzones.
 Rivervale
 Compassvale
 Anchorvale
 Fernvale
 Sengkang Town Centre
 Sengkang West
 Lorong Halus North

Demographics
As of 1 March 2020, Sengkang has a population of 240,640, most of whom are part of the working population. The most populous subzone is Rivervale with 61,400 residents, closely followed by Sengkang Town Centre with 60,800 residents. Sengkang West, however, has just ten residents, while Lorong Halus North is completely unpopulated.

Notable places

Sengkang's two main rivers, Sungei Punggol and Sungei Serangoon, run through the town with a network of green connectors along their banks. They link housing precincts to neighbourhood parks such as Sengkang Riverside Park, as well as the Sengkang Swimming Complex, Sengkang Hockey Stadium and Anchorvale Community Centre. These park connectors are linked to the Coney Island Park in Punggol New Town and the existing Punggol Park in the south, to better serve the recreational needs of the residents of Sengkang. Sengkang Sculpture Park, located in Compassvale, is an elongated green space created below the LRT viaducts.

Sengkang's major public transport amenities were built in tandem with the main public housing development. The main heavy rail tunnels through Sengkang and the elevated track infrastructure of the intra-town Sengkang LRT were developed as the existing public housing blocks were being built in the late 1990s. The amenities were built in a contiguous building complex, which gives commuters direct access between Sengkang MRT/LRT station, Sengkang Bus Interchange, Compass Heights condominium and Compass One shopping centre. The Compassvale bus Interchange was later built besides Sengkang Bus Interchange, and came into operations on 12 March 2017.

Transportation
City planners plan for public transport to eventually become the preferred mode of transport. The government of Singapore uses public transport to reduce pollution caused by heavy road traffic. Sengkang is part of the Urban Redevelopment Authority's focus for realising this urban planning model. As Sengkang is relatively distant from the city centre at the Central Area, an efficient, high-volume and high-speed public transport system is also preferred to using road networks, as the government is aiming to reduce the number of cars on the road.

Public transport

North East line

Sengkang Town is linked to the Central Area via the North East MRT Line (NEL) at Sengkang MRT/LRT station, located at the Town Centre, and Buangkok station, located at the southern end of the town. The NEL is a fully automated heavy rail mass rapid transit line which started operations on 20 June 2003. It is operated by SBS Transit.

Sengkang station, an interchange with the Sengkang LRT, shares a building complex with Sengkang Bus Interchange for commuters' ease of switching across the different available modes of public transport. The MRT portion of the station began operations on 20 June 2003, together with most of the NEL, whereas the LRT portion of the station had already opened on 18 January that year.

Buangkok station, the other station along the NEL in Sengkang Town, serves the housing developments in Buangkok, at Compassvale, and the northern part of Hougang New Town. The station was initially left unopened due to a lack of development in the vicinity, but started operations on 15 January 2006 once the first development in the area was completed.

Sengkang LRT line

The intra-town Sengkang Light Rail Transit (LRT) system is a 10.7 km light rail line that serves to link residents to the town centre.  It is a fully automated system, and its rolling stock is supplied by Mitsubishi Heavy Industries. The system is also operated by SBS Transit.  The Sengkang LRT line forms two loops, East Loop and West Loop, that skirt the perimeter of the new town. The LRT line has 14 stations and all are in operation. The line began service on 18 January 2003.

Sengkang Bus Interchange

The Sengkang Bus Interchange was opened on 12 June 1998 as a terminal. At that time, developments around the area in Sengkang New Town were still actively in progress. The Sengkang Bus Interchange is located at the ground level of Compass Heights condominium, next to Sengkang station, which was opened on 18 January 2003, and is the second air-conditioned bus interchange in Singapore, after Toa Payoh Bus Interchange.

Compassvale Bus Interchange

On 24 November 2014, LTA officially announced the expansion of the Sengkang Bus Interchange to accommodate future bus services under the Bus Service Enhancement Programme (BSEP) Scheme as the current interchange does not have enough parking spaces for more services. The expansion consists of 12 additional parking bays, boarding and alighting facilities, concourse area, staff lounge and a canteen. The expansion works were completed in the third quarter of 2016. The extension, named Compassvale Bus Interchange, is located adjacent to Sengkang Bus Interchange along Sengkang Square and it officially opened on 12 March 2017.

Future bus interchange at Buangkok
A new bus interchange which will be part of a mixed, integrated development, named Sengkang Grand Residences/Mall, is due to be completed by 2023, is under construction at Buangkok. It will be accessible by Buangkok MRT on the North East Line.

Road network

Sengkang is connected to many parts of Singapore through its road network. The Tampines Expressway (TPE) links Sengkang Town up with Singapore's expressway network. The Kallang-Paya Lebar Expressway, which provides a direct route to the city area via TPE, was completed in late 2008. New roads were built in the early 2000s to ease traffic congestion on Punggol Road. Buangkok Green and Buangkok Drive were completed in the second half of 1999. They shorten the drive from the Central Expressway near Ang Mo Kio Avenue 5 to Punggol Road. The first part of a S$23 million project to make Sengkang town less congested was opened on 7 April 2001. The completed work involved an extension to Sengkang East Road, which runs from Compassvale Street to Tampines Expressway (TPE), and a slip road to the TPE in the direction of the Seletar and Central Expressways. The second part of the project involved the completion of the Sengkang East Road and Sengkang East Drive Flyovers. The Sengkang East Road and Sengkang East Drive Flyovers were officially opened on 16 May 2004, making it easier for residents of Sengkang and Punggol new towns in the north-east to travel to other parts of Singapore. Extensions had been made to Sengkang West Avenue and Sengkang West Way to connect to the future Sengkang West Industrial Park.

Major roads that run within the boundaries of Sengkang Planning Area include Sengkang East Drive, Sengkang East Avenue, Sengkang East Road, Sengkang East Way, Sengkang West Avenue, Sengkang West Road, Sengkang West Way and Jalan Kayu.

Sengkang Town Centre
There are four major building complexes within the Sengkang Town Centre.

Compass Heights
Compass Heights is a private condominium complex that is integrated with public transportation facilities in its surroundings.

Sengkang Interchange
Sengkang Interchange, located in the centre of the town, consists of the Sengkang Bus Interchange and the Sengkang MRT/LRT station.

Compass One
Compass One, formerly known as Compass Point is Singapore's first thematic suburban shopping centre based on the theme of learning. The Compass Point Shopping Centre was constructed at a cost of S$230 million. The shopping mall started operations in August 2002. The only other shopping mall that predated Compass One is Rivervale Plaza, which were initially built off an open-bazaar concept with a wet market till its renovation transforming it into an official shopping mall in 2013.

Sengkang Community Hub
Sengkang Community Hub, and its community club and neighbourhood police centre, were officially opened by Teo Chee Hean, Minister for Defence and Member of Parliament for Pasir Ris-Punggol Group Representation Constituency, on 10 December 2005. Some of the facilities that it houses are the KK Women's Clinic @ Sengkang, Sengkang Central Constituency Office, Sengkang Neighbourhood Police Centre, Sengkang Community Club, and the Sengkang Branch of Singapore Post Office.

Amenities

Education
There are 12 primary schools and six secondary schools in Sengkang New Town. Land provision has also been made for a junior college in the town to meet future educational demand in the North-East Region.

There are also five large childcare centres being built since then, to provide the needs of the town's large demographic of young families.

Commercial facilities
The town depended on one neighbourhood mall; Rivervale Plaza, which was built by HDB and opened in 1999 with a wet market, several shops and a NTUC Fairprice supermarket, before Rivervale Mall opened in 2001. Compass Point opened in 2002, a year before the Sengkang MRT/LRT station & air-conditioned bus interchange opened.

Fernvale Point served the residents of Sengkang West and mostly Fernvale for almost ten years, which was eventually demolished. Seletar Mall, opened in 2014 with the first ever cinema in Sengkang.

Anchorvale Village, a mixed residential/commercial development; slated to open by 2022, will open with a 3-storey hawker centre and neighbourhood shops within its compound below HDB blocks. As of 2023, the development's expected completion date is by end of 2023.

Community facilities
The first community centre of the new town, Rivervale Community Centre, was opened on 20 June 2004, by Teo Chee Hean, Minister of Defence and Member of Parliament for Pasir Ris-Punggol Group Representation Constituency, which was situated at the void deck of Blk 193 Rivervale Drive. It served residents of the town a year before Sengkang Community Club opened a year later at the Town Centre. 

Sengkang community centre was then relocated to a new building behind Rivervale Plaza, which was scheduled to open in 2020 but was delayed a year due to the COVID-19 pandemic, opening on 15 September 2021 instead. Anchorvale Community Club opened beside the Sengkang Sports Complex in 2009, while the Fernvale Community Club opened in 2022 with a hawker centre, childcare and a wet market.

A new standalone, Rivervale Community Centre, was built to replace the old Rivervale Community Centre. It was opened on 30 July 2022.

The HDB Branch Office for Sengkang is at Rivervale Plaza.

Fire stations

Sengkang Fire Station, which opened on 19 May 2001, is the biggest fire station in Singapore. The S$14 million fire station covers 7,000 square metres, and is used by the Singapore Civil Defense Force. Sengkang Fire Station has a capacity for 700 fire fighters and rescue personnel. It is also the first station to employ a water conservation system where water used during drills are diverted to a pump well for recycling purposes.

Medical facilities
Sengkang General and Community Hospital is a 1,400 bed regional hospital serving the residents of the north-east region. The hospital was opened on 18 August 2018. Also located in Sengkang is the SingHealth Sengkang Polyclinic.

Sports facilities
Sengkang Sports Centre, formerly known as Sengkang Sports and Recreation Centre, it is co-located with the People’s Association Anchorvale Community Club, and offers one of the two sheltered pools managed by Sports Singapore. Sengkang has established itself as a world-class venue for hockey, with significant facility upgrades being undertaken for the inaugural Youth Olympic Games in 2010.

Politics
In the current parliament, elected by the 2020 general election, there are six MPs representing Sengkang, four from the Workers' Party in Sengkang GRC and two of the five from the People's Action Party in Ang Mo Kio GRC. Sengkang GRC comprises Rivervale, Compassvale, Sengkang Town Centre and Anchorvale, while Fernvale and Jalan Kayu comprises part of Ang Mo Kio GRC  .

Sengkang has been divided and split into many constituencies in the past. Before 1988, the entire area east of Sungei Punggol fell under Punggol SMC, its Member of Parliament (MP) was Ng Kah Ting, who served from 1963 to 1991. The area west of Sungei Punggol fell under Jalan Kayu SMC, whose MP was Heng Chiang Meng, who entered Parliament in 1984. Jalan Kayu SMC was absorbed into Cheng San GRC in 1988, followed by Punggol SMC in 1991; by then, the entire Sengkang Town and Punggol New Town were under Cheng San GRC. Michael Lim became the MP for Punggol division following Ng Kah Ting's retirement.

For the 1997 general election, Punggol division of Cheng San GRC was split into three wards, Punggol Central, Punggol East and Punggol South, as a result of the growing population in Hougang. The current Sengkang planning area was under Michael Lim, who served the Punggol Central ward. The GRC was contested by a Workers' Party (WP) team led by the then-Secretary-General and former opposition MP Joshua Benjamin Jeyaretnam, and Tang Liang Hong, a senior lawyer. In 2001, Rivervale and Compassvale fell within the newly-formed Pasir Ris–Punggol GRC, as part of the Punggol South and Punggol Central wards, with Michael Lim and Charles Chong respectively as their MPs. Most of Anchorvale and Fernvale fell within the Jalan Kayu division of Ang Mo Kio GRC, under Wee Siew Kim.

In the 2006 general election, Pasir Ris–Punggol GRC was expanded from five to six MPs as the population in Sengkang and Punggol new towns had grown since 2001. As such, the Punggol East ward was formed from parts of the Punggol South and Punggol North wards, served by Michael Palmer. Michael Lim retired from politics in 2006 and did not take part in the election that year, with Teo Ser Luck replacing him in the Punggol South ward. Meanwhile, in Ang Mo Kio GRC, Jalan Kayu division was carved to include Sengkang West ward, returning debut MP Lam Pin Min to parliament.

Most of Rivervale was carved out of Pasir Ris–Punggol GRC to form the Punggol East SMC in the 2011 general election. Punggol East SMC saw the only three-cornered fight in the 2011 elections, with Palmer from the People's Action Party, Desmond Lim from the Singapore Democratic Alliance, and Lee Li Lian from the Workers' Party contesting, eventually the SMC was retained by incumbent Michael Palmer. Compassvale, and a small portion of Rivervale, came under the Punggol South and Punggol Central divisions of Pasir Ris–Punggol GRC, with Teo Ser Luck taking over as MP for Punggol Central from Charles Chong, and Gan Thiam Poh replacing Teo in Punggol South. Anchorvale and Fernvale were carved into Sengkang West SMC, with Lam Pin Min as its MP. In December 2012, Palmer quit the PAP over an extra-marital affair, thereby vacating his seat and paving the way for a by-election in Punggol East SMC that was called by the Prime Minister in January 2013. SDA's Lim and WP's Lee returned to contest the by-election, and the PAP fielded a newcomer, Koh Poh Koon, who had joined the party only three weeks earlier. They were joined by a fourth competing party, the Reform Party, represented by its secretary-general Kenneth Jeyaretnam. Despite this being a four-way fight, WP's Lee emerged victorious with 54.52% of valid votes cast, shocking many on both sides of the political divide, who expected it to be a close fight. PAP's Koh came in second with 43.71% of the votes, with the RP and SDA candidates losing their electoral deposits with less than 2% of the votes combined.

Lee Li Lian was unseated in the 2015 general election to the PAP's candidate and then-Deputy Speaker Charles Chong when he garnered 51.76% of the valid votes cast, while Lee got the remaining 48.24%. Teo Ser Luck's Punggol Central ward in Pasir Ris–Punggol GRC was renamed as Sengkang Central, while Gan Thiam Poh's Punggol South ward was transferred to Ang Mo Kio GRC and renamed as Sengkang South. A portion of Fernvale was absorbed from Sengkang West SMC back into Ang Mo Kio GRC as part of the Sengkang South ward.

In 2020, a new namesake four-member GRC was formed from Punggol East SMC, the eastern half of Sengkang West SMC and the Sengkang Central ward of Pasir Ris–Punggol GRC. The Sengkang Central ward was split into half, with the Compassvale ward formed from the northern half of Compassvale and the Buangkok ward consisting the southern part of Compassvale and a small portion of Rivervale; Punggol East and Sengkang West were renamed Rivervale and Anchorvale respectively. With the retirements of Charles Chong and Teo Ser Luck, then-Minister in the Prime Minister's Office Ng Chee Meng was sent to lead the People's Action Party team in the 2020 general election. Raymond Lye succeeded Chong in Punggol East, while Sengkang Central was intended to be divided between Ng and Amrin Amin, with Lam Pin Min defending Sengkang West. However, they were defeated by a Worker's Party team consisting of He Ting Ru, Jamus Lim, Louis Chua and Raeesah Khan, who would serve as the MPs for Buangkok, Anchorvale, Rivervale and Compassvale respectively. Fernvale was re-absorbed into Ang Mo Kio GRC, forming a namesake division with Gan Thiam Poh as its MP.

Raeesah Khan resigned from Workers' Party on 30 November 2021. Similar to Marsiling-Yew Tee GRC of which a minority MP had left the GRC, no by-election will be called at all; the minority representation in Parliament will not be affected as there are only 26 of them.

Town Councils
Currently, Sengkang falls under the jurisdiction of two town councils:Sengkang Town Council and Ang Mo Kio Town Council. Most of Sengkang is under the Sengkang Town Council which is managed by the Workers' Party, while the Fernvale and Jalan Kayu constituencies are under the PAP-run Ang Mo Kio Town Council.

Prior to 2015, the town has seen jurisdiction under various town councils. With Cheng San Town Council from the beginning of the town to its dissolution in 2001, after which the wards of Punggol Central was under Pasir Ris-Punggol, throughout 2001-2020, while Jalan Kayu, then split into Sengkang West, under Ang Mo Kio, throughout 2001–present and for a short time, Aljunied-Hougang-Punggol East, which manages Punggol East SMC then from 2013-2015.

See also

New towns of Singapore

References

Bibliography

External links

Sengkang Town Council
Ang Mo Kio Town Council
Pasir Ris-Punggol Town Council
Central Singapore Community Development Council
Northeast Community Development Council
Sengkang West Portal
Jalan Kayu Community Website 
Pasir Ris-Punggol GRC Town Portal

 
New towns in Singapore
North-East Region, Singapore
Places in Singapore
 
New towns started in the 1990s